Leslie Roy Miller  (30 March 1911 – 1959) was an English professional footballer who played for Barking, Northampton Town, Sochaux, Tottenham Hotspur, Chesterfield and Mansfield Town.

Football career 
Miller played for Barking, Northampton Town and French club Sochaux before joining Tottenham Hotspur in 1936. The outside left featured in 65 matches and scored on 26 occasions in all competitions for the Lilywhites. In 1939 he signed for Chesterfield where he made two appearances before ending his playing career at Mansfield Town.

References 

1911 births
1959 deaths
Footballers from Romford
Association football forwards
English footballers
English Football League players
Barking F.C. players
Northampton Town F.C. players
FC Sochaux-Montbéliard players
Tottenham Hotspur F.C. players
Chesterfield F.C. players
Mansfield Town F.C. players
Ligue 1 players